Women and the Church (WATCH) is a group of women and men who have been campaigning for gender equality (and especially for the ordination of women as bishops) in the Church of England. The group was initially created during the 1990s as London WATCH in order to ensure the acceptance of female priests in the Church of England. The organization traces its origins to the Movement for the Ordination of Women, which campaigned for the ordination of women as priests in the Church of England.

External links
 

Anglican feminism
Church of England
Ordination of women in the Anglican Communion
Women in London